Prosper Marketplace, Inc. is a San Francisco, California-based financial services company.  Prosper Funding LLC, one of its subsidiaries, operates Prosper.com, a website where individuals can request to borrow money, open a credit card, or invest in personal loans.

Overview 
Prosper Marketplace is America's first peer-to-peer lending marketplace, with over $23 billion in funded loans. Borrowers request personal loans on Prosper and investors (individual or institutional) can fund anywhere from $2,000 to $50,000 per loan request. Investors can consider borrowers’ credit scores, ratings, and histories and the category of the loan. Prosper handles the servicing of the loan and collects and distributes borrower payments and interest back to the loan investors.

Prosper verifies borrowers' identities and select personal data before funding loans and manages all stages of loan servicing.  Prosper's unsecured personal loans are fully amortized over a period of three or five years, with no pre-payment penalties. Prosper generates revenue by collecting a one-time fee on funded loans from borrowers and assessing an annual loan servicing fee to investors.

From 2006 to 2009 Prosper operated a variable rate model. Prosper acted as an eBay-style online auction marketplace, with lenders and borrowers ultimately determining loan rates using a Dutch auction-like system. Effective December 19, 2010, Prosper filed a new prospectus with the SEC, changing its business model to use pre-set rates determined solely by Prosper based on a formula evaluating each prospective borrower's credit risk. Under the new approach, lenders no longer determine the loan rate via price discovery in an auction. Instead, they simply choose whether or not to invest at the rate which Prosper's loan pricing algorithm assigns to the loan after it analyzes the borrower's credit report and financial information.

The idea for the service is derived from group banking concepts, such as rotating savings and credit associations. Other motivating ideas derive from the concepts of microlending and microfinance.

Prosper publishes performance statistics on its website and all market data is available to the public for analysis. All transactions are in US dollars; lenders and borrowers must be US residents.  Prosper's 10.69% annualized seasoned rate of return, net of fees, for the period of July 1, 2009 through September 30, 2011 was independently audited by Ashland Partners & Company LLP in December 2011.

In 2016 Prosper Marketplace unveiled Prosper Daily, a mobile app. The app is designed to give consumers tools to make financial decisions, including viewing all their financial accounts in one place, budgeting and tracking spending by category, identifying questionable charges, and monitoring their free credit score, which is updated monthly.

Prosper opened to the public on February 5, 2006 and was founded by Chris Larsen (the founder of E-loan) and John Witchel. Prosper is  backed by BlackRock, Sequoia Capital, Accel Partners, Agilus Ventures, Benchmark Capital, CrossLink Capital, DAG Ventures, Draper Fisher Jurvetson, Fidelity Ventures, Omidyar Network (an investment vehicle of eBay founder Pierre Omidyar), Meritech Capital Partners, TomorrowVentures (an investment vehicle of Google Executive Chairman Eric Schmidt), and QED Investors (an investment vehicle of Capital One co-founder Nigel Morris).

Evaluation of credit risk 
Prosper has provided an increasing amount of information about prospective borrowers over time, while also making various changes to its credit policy. Prior to its 2008 'quiet period' and 2009 SEC registration, the company provided "Credit Grades" and other credit information about its prospective lenders. Following the SEC registration, the company created a new model that determined "Prosper Ratings" instead. Additionally, new prospective borrowers were required to have an FICO 8 credit score of at least 640, while returning borrowers only need a score of 600 to request a loan.

Prosper Ratings 
Since its SEC registration in 2009, Prosper has provided a proprietary "Prosper Rating" for prospective borrowers based on the company's estimation of that borrower's "estimated loss rate." According to the company, that figure is "determined by two scores: (1) the credit score, obtained from an official credit reporting agency, and (2) the Prosper Score, figured in-house based on the Prosper population." Prosper Ratings, from lowest-risk to highest-risk, are labeled AA, A, B, C, D, E, and HR ("High Risk").

Business model 
Prosper has a transaction-based business model, in which the company collects revenue by taking a fee on its customers' transactions. Borrowers who receive a loan, pay an origination fee of 1.00% to 5.00%, depending on the borrower's Prosper Rating, and investors pay a 1% annual servicing fee.

Secondary market / Trading platform - Development and Termination
As borrowers repay over the three, or five-year fixed term of their Prosper loan, payments are distributed to investors' accounts. This money may then be re-invested into new Prosper loans or withdrawn from Prosper by transfer into the bank accounts of the Prosper investors.

Prosper had developed a secondary market for note trading, in cooperation with Folio Investing.  Through the secondary market platform, investors were able to buy and sell Prosper loans ("notes") at any time.  However, Prosper declared in its prospective dated December 21, 2016, that its relationship with Folio Investing had terminated on October 31, 2016.  Consequently, note purchasers were informed that they would have to hold their notes to maturity unless Prosper were to establish a new secondary market platform, for which it made no assurance.

Wells Fargo appears as a trustee in Prospers note indenture.

IRA investor accounts 
As of March 1, 2012, Prosper allows tax-free or tax-deferred investment via self-directed IRA accounts.  Traditional IRAs, Roth IRAs, SEP IRAs, and 401(k) Rollovers are supported through Prosper's IRA custodian partners Equity Institutional and Millennium Trust.  The minimum investment required to open a self-directed Prosper IRA account is $5,000.

Cease and desist order 
On November 24, 2008, the SEC found Prosper to be in violation of the Securities Act of 1933. As a result of these findings, the SEC imposed a cease and desist order on Prosper. Due primarily to the novel nature of the peer-to-peer lending models, the SEC, after review, now treats all peer-to-peer lending transactions as sales of securities and requires that all platforms register with the SEC.

Litigation 
On November 26, 2008, a class action lawsuit was filed against Prosper in the Superior Court of California, County of San Francisco, California.  The suit was brought on behalf of all loan note purchasers in Prosper's online lending platform from January 1, 2006 through October 14, 2008 and alleges that Prosper offered and sold unqualified and unregistered securities in violation of the California and federal securities laws.  The lawsuit seeks class certification, damages, the right of rescission and the award of attorneys’ fees.

Prosper's insurer, Greenwich Insurance Company, refused to pay for defense expenses, claiming the matters involved were not covered by the insurance policy. On December 14, 2010, Judge Richard A. Kramer of California Superior Court issued a tentative decision ruling for Prosper on this limited issue and holding that Greenwich is obligated to defend Prosper in the class-action suit and to reimburse Prosper's litigation expenses so far. Although the decision did not rule on the lawsuit itself or address whether Prosper might be entitled to insurance coverage in the event any of the lawsuit's claims proved meritorious, it relieved Prosper of significant legal expenses in the interim.

The lawsuit was settled July 19, 2013 for 10 million dollars paid in installments over three years.

2009 post SEC relaunch 
In July 2009, Prosper reopened their website for lending ("investing") and borrowing after having obtained SEC registration for its loans ("notes").  After the relaunch, bidding on loans was restricted to residents of 28 U.S. states and the District of Columbia.  Borrowers may reside in any of 47 states, with residents of three states (Iowa, Maine, and North Dakota) not permitted to borrow through Prosper.

Financial structure of Prosper loans 
According to the prospectus issued to investors on July 13, 2009, Prosper notes since relaunch are obligations of Prosper Marketplace and not of the original borrower. Prosper promises to pay the noteholder ("investor") the funds it receives from the underlying borrower. Noteholders of Prosper's "member payment dependent" notes are considered unsecured creditors of Prosper Marketplace with limited recourse against it. The Prospectus states that in the event Prosper becomes insolvent or declares bankruptcy, investors in Prosper notes may lose all or part of their investment even if the underlying borrower continues to pay. Investors' recourse in the event borrower-supplied information proves incorrect for any reason is also "extremely" limited.  This structure is identical to that adopted by LendingClub after SEC registration.

Prosper credit card 

In 2022, Forbes gave a negative review of the Prosper credit card.  According to Forbes, "Prospering with the Prosper® Card* seems unlikely... We hope you live long and… well, apply for a different credit card."

Market performance

Loan performance 
Prosper maintains a full public database of all loans issued through its marketplace on its website.  This database and all market statistics can be accessed and queried for analysis of loan performance over time.  An interface to run complex performance queries is supported and allows investors (and the public) to look into the performance of any subset of loans over whatever time period they choose.

Prosper reports a 10.69% annualized seasoned rate of return, net of fees, for all loans issued from its re-opening after SEC registration (July 1, 2009) to the 30th of September, 2011.  Prosper's returns for this period have been independently audited by Ashland Partners & Company LLP.  A number of factors, including Prosper's decision to set the interest rates on all loans (rather than let investors choose the rates they would accept), occurred after Prosper registered with the SEC and began issuing new loan notes in July, 2009.  Additionally, after Prosper began setting the rates on all loans itself, Prosper significantly tightened the minimum credit quality necessary for a borrower to receive a Prosper loan.  Many borrowers who received loans prior to 2009 (which were priced by investors) would no longer qualify for a loan, at any rate, under Prosper's new underwriting policies.

Loan performance prior to July 2009 
As of August 2008, approximately 18.5% of all money loaned through Prosper from inception (February 2006) through June 2008 were in some form of delinquency. Also, more than 35% of all loans that originated in February 2007 were in some form of delinquency.

As of January 24, 2010, Prosper reported that 22.45% of all money lent since inception had been charged off and an additional 2.51% was delinquent but not yet charged off. Charge-off rates by credit score category ranged from 11.57% of money lent to borrowers with a credit score of 760 or higher to 44.30% of money lent to borrowers with a credit score below 600. Eric's Credit Community reported generally consistent delinquency results, with a 24-month delinquency rate by credit grade for loans originated after January 1, 2006 ranging from 11.8% for 'AA' loans to 61.6% for 'HR' loans. The charge-off rates in many cases exceeded the interest received on the loan categories, resulting in a negative return. Eric's reported that the median return to Prosper investors was negative 2.00% and the mean return negative 2.28.

After Prosper's relaunch in July 2009, and implementing stricter credit guidelines for borrowers  Prosper's loan default rate has been significantly reduced. The percentage of all loans that are 6+ months old, and are 1+ month late, dropped to less than 4%. As of Aug 11, 2010, the 4 months that match these criteria are the lowest percentage of late payments Prosper has seen since inception.

Financial history 
Since its 2009 relaunch, Prosper received a Series D funding round of $14.7M in April 2010 with participation from all previous investors as well as new investors CompuCredit and TomorrowVentures. TomorrowVentures is an investment vehicle funded by Google Executive Chairman Eric Schmidt.

Bloomberg BusinessWeek reported on November 11, 2010 that Prosper was seeking additional funding and Prosper received an additional funding infusion in a Series E round on June 3, 2011. According to Prosper's SEC filing, the company raised $17.15 million by selling additional shares at an average of approximately $0.738/share. Series E investors included Draper Fisher Jurvetson, Crosslink Capital, Accel Partners, Agilus Ventures and TomorrowVentures.

In January 2013, Prosper received $20 million in funding led by Sequoia Capital, followed by $25 million in September 2013 led by Sequoia Capital and BlackRock. In May 2014, Prosper announced a $70 million funding round led by Francisco Partners. Credit Suisse's NEXT fund led an investment of $165 million in Prosper in April 2015. In 2017, Prosper raised US$50 million in a Series G round, led by FinEX Asia's private equity division.

Loan to terrorist 
In December 2015, the FBI reported that Syed Rizwan Farook, one of the shooters in the 2015 San Bernardino attack, had borrowed $28,000 from Prosper to finance the purchase of weapons and explosives. This is now being investigated by the FBI, the House Financial Services Committee, and the California Department of Business Oversight.

See also 
 Comparison of crowd funding services

References

External links 
 Official Site

Peer-to-peer lending companies
Online marketplaces of the United States